Raúl Muñiz (born 2 August 1956) is a Puerto Rican luger. He competed in the men's singles event at the 1988 Winter Olympics.

References

1956 births
Living people
Puerto Rican male lugers
Olympic lugers of Puerto Rico
Lugers at the 1988 Winter Olympics
Place of birth missing (living people)